Richard Heinrich Ludwig Münch (10 January 1916 – 6 June 1987) was a German actor, best known for portraying Alfred Jodl in Patton (1970). He also portrayed General Erich Marcks in The Longest Day (1962).

Selected filmography

 Der Verlorene (1951) - Criminal Inspector No. 1 (uncredited)
 Zwei blaue Augen (1955) - Schneider, Ingenieur
 Doctor Crippen Lives (1958) - Reverend Bennet
 Nasser Asphalt (1958) - Dr. Wolf
 Restless Night (1958) - Kriegsgerichtsrat
  (1959) - Herr Wegner, Director of the "Imperial"
 Stalingrad: Dogs, Do You Want to Live Forever? (1959) - Oberstleutnant Kesselbach
 Crime After School (1959) - Oberst Dr. König
 Heaven, Love and Twine (1960) - Major Knorr
  (1961) 
 The Miracle of Father Malachia (1961) - Dr. Erwin Glass
 Redhead (1962) - Joachim
 The Longest Day (1962) - Gen. Erich Marcks
 The Inn on the River (1962) - Dr. Collins
 Waiting Room to the Beyond (1964) - Mario Orlandi di Alsconi
 The Visit (1964) - Teacher
 The Train (1964) - Gen. Von Lubitz
 Jerry Cotton 1: Manhattan Night of Murder (1965) - Mr. High
 Who Wants to Sleep? (1965) - Walter Morten
 Jerry Cotton 2: Tread Softly (1965) - Mr. High
 Hocuspocus (1966) - Gerichtspräsident
 Jerry Cotton 3: Die Rechnung – eiskalt serviert (1966) - Mr. High
 Killer's Carnival (1966) - Professor Alden (Frame story)
  (1966) - Dr. Freytag
 Jerry Cotton 4: The Trap Snaps Shut at Midnight (1966) - Mr. High
 The Pipes (1966) - Lord Edward
 Jerry Cotton 5: Murderers Club of Brooklyn (1967) - Mr. High
 Hot Pavements of Cologne (1967) - Public Prosecutor Dr. Rolf Stauffer
 The Bridge at Remagen (1969) - Feldmarschall Von Sturmer
 Sir Basil Zaharoff – Makler des Todes (1969, TV film) - Basil Zaharoff
 Patton (1970) - Colonel General Alfred Jodl
 Der Kommissar: Dr. Meinhardts trauriges Ende (1970, TV series episode) -  Dr. Bibeina 
 Maximilian von Mexiko (1970, TV film) - Kardinal
 Perahim – die zweite Chance (1974, TV film) - Bogini
 : Stirb! (1976, TV series episode) - Ernst Brühl
 Derrick: Kalkutta (1976, TV series episode) - Konsistorialrat
 Group Portrait with a Lady (1977) - Hubert Gruyten
 The Old Fox: Bumerang (1978, TV series episode) -  Dr. Kargus 
 Die seltsamen Begegnungen des Prof. Taratonga (1978, TV film) - Prof. Tarantoga
 Der ganz normale Wahnsinn (1979, TV series) - Jungblut, Verleger
 The Old Fox: Der Tote im Wagen (1983, TV series episode) -  Dr. Dannhaus
 The Holcroft Covenant (1985) - Oberst 
 Target (1985) - Colonel
 Derrick: Der Charme der Bahamas (1986, TV series episode) -  Richard Haber
 Of Pure Blood (1986, TV film) - Dr. Bamberg
  (1987, TV miniseries) - Consul Lürmann
 Le grand secret (1989, TV miniseries) - Prof. Bahanba

External links

1916 births
1987 deaths
German male film actors
German male television actors
People from Giessen
20th-century German male actors
German Film Award winners